Charbakh is a Yerevan Metro station. It was opened to the public on 26 December, 1996. As it branches off from the Shengavit station away from Garegin Nzhdeh Square it is also served by a shuttle service from Shengavit.

References

Yerevan Metro stations
Railway stations opened in 1996
1996 establishments in Armenia